Hugo Cores was an influential Uruguayan political activist and libertarian socialist. He was born in Argentina and moved to Uruguay during his childhood.  He founded Partido por la Victoria del Pueblo in 1975, during the civic-military dictatorship of Uruguay. Cores joined the Broad Front in 1984. After the dictatorship, President Tabaré Vázquez appointed Cores political secretary of the Broad Front. He served as political secretary from 1989 to 1993.

Hugo Cores died of a heart attack at the age of 69 in Montevideo, Uruguay.

References 

1937 births
2006 deaths
Operation Condor
Uruguayan anarchists
Burials at Cementerio del Buceo, Montevideo